Kirya-Konzəl is a recently documented Chadic language of Nigeria, though it was first attested in 1931. The varieties, Fali of Kirya (Kirya) and Fali of Mijilu (Konzəl), are very close.

References

External links
Blench, Roger, and A. Ndamsai, 2007. A Dictionary of Kirya and Konzəl in Northeastern Nigeria
Yoder, Z. 2011. ISO 639-3 proposal

Biu-Mandara languages
Languages of Nigeria
Articles citing ISO change requests